Cashiers is a census-designated place (CDP) and unincorporated village located in southern Jackson County, North Carolina, United States. As of the 2020 United States census, the community had a total population of 657, up from 157 at the 2010 census. Cashiers is pronounced KASH-erz locally, and is one of several communities in the area popular with tourists and owners of vacation homes.

The village is at the crossroads of U.S. Route 64 (US 64) and North Carolina Highway 107 (NC 107), which connects to Highlands, Rosman, Sylva, and Walhalla.

History
The establishment of Cashiers begins with two men: Barak Norton, the first white settler in Whiteside Cove, and Colonel John Zachary, who with his talented sons was responsible for the area’s economic and civic development. Barak Norton came to the area around 1820, and the land he claimed in the area, including a gold mine, would eventually become Cashiers main business district. The Zachary family setup several businesses including general store and sawmill, and provided trade skills including brick mason, hatter, and carpenter.

Several stories exist where the name Cashiers came from, including a racehorse, steer, or mule named Cash or a hermit living in the area with the name. However, it is concluded that the Zachary Family were the ones came up with the name related to their accounting work for individual gold miners in the area, being the "cashier." In 1939, Jonathan Zachary, the youngest son of the family, applied to become the first postmaster for, what he called, "Cashiers Valley;" this would later be changed to Cashiers in 1881.

In 1851, the first Post Office was established. In 1855, the Zachary Family sold land to Wade Hampton II, in what later became the High Hampton Inn.

In 1927, Cashiers received a town charter from the state, but has since become inactive with no acting government body. In 2003, the North Carolina General Assembly passed local legislation allowing Cashiers to re-incorporate, but this was turned down by a vote of 161 to 302 in a local referendum on August 12. The Jackson County government setup a special zoning council for Cashiers in response; operated by the county, it covers what would normally be done by a municipality.

Five properties near Cashiers are listed on the National Register of Historic Places—Camp Merrie-Woode, the Church of the Good Shepherd, Fairfield Inn, the High Hampton Inn Historic District, and the Mordecai Zachary House.

Geography
Cashiers is located at  (35.111978, -83.099488).

Cashiers and the nearby towns of Highlands, Glenville, and Sapphire comprise a popular mountain vacation area near the southern end of the Blue Ridge Mountains, the easternmost front of the Appalachian Mountains. Cashiers is surrounded by scenic views, waterfalls and Nantahala National Forest lands. Visitors and vacation home owners from all over the southeast enjoy hiking, mountain biking, golf and fly fishing during the warm months of the year.

The United States Forest Service and The Nature Conservancy have both worked to protect several natural areas near Cashiers, including biologically diverse Panthertown Valley, Whitewater Falls, and the Tuckaseegee River Gorge. The Chattooga River also rises near Cashiers.

Climate
Cashiers receives an average of 87.57 inches of precipitation annually, over 7.25 inches a month, making it one of the rainiest places in the eastern United States. It is also one of the coolest places in the mountains, with an average daily July temperature of 78 degrees.

Demographics

As of the census of 2000, there were 196 people, 96 households, and 48 families residing in the community. The population density was 182.0 people per square mile (70.1/km2). There were 182 housing units at an average density of 169.0 per square mile (65.1/km2). The racial makeup of the community was 98.98% White, and 1.02% from two or more races. Hispanic or Latino of any race were 0.51% of the population.

There were 96 households, out of which 15.6% had children under the age of 18 living with them, 46.9% were married couples living together, 3.1% had a female householder with no husband present, and 49.0% were non-families. 39.6% of all households were made up of individuals, and 15.6% had someone living alone who was 65 years of age or older. The average household size was 2.04 and the average family size was 2.76.

In the community, the population was spread out, with 14.3% under the age of 18, 6.6% from 18 to 24, 24.0% from 25 to 44, 36.7% from 45 to 64, and 18.4% who were 65 years of age or older. The median age was 49 years. For every 100 females, there were 94.1 males. For every 100 females, age 18 and over, there were 100.0 males.

The median income for a household in the community was $37,500, and the median income for a family was $51,458. Males had a median income of $26,339 versus $23,750 for females. The per capita income for the CDP was $22,845. None of the families and 4.2% of the population were living below the poverty line, including no under 18s and 15.2% of those over 64.

See also
National Register of Historic Places listings in Jackson County, North Carolina

References

External links
Cashiers Area Chamber of Commerce & Visitor Center.
Cashiers411.com - Comprehensive Online Community Calendar.
CashiersAreaJobs.com - Work Somewhere Awesome! Online Community Jobs Board.

CashiersNorthCarolina.org - Cashiers Website

Census-designated places in Jackson County, North Carolina
Unincorporated communities in North Carolina
Census-designated places in North Carolina
Unincorporated communities in Jackson County, North Carolina